Henri Dekking (13 December 1871 – 8 October 1939) was a Dutch journalist and writer.

Biography
Dekking was born on 13 December 1871 in Rotterdam as Henri Marinus Dekking. Rotterdam would remain his home for the rest of his life.

Dekking was editor at the Dutch newspaper Rotterdamsch Nieuwsblad from 1892 until 1937.

Dekking performed in plays. He usually translated the plays himself. Dekking is best remembered for his performance of Cyrano de Bergerac which he performed over 500 times during his life. He was also active as a playwright. His best known work is Kwakzalvers (1917).

He wrote several novels. He made his debut with Getroffenen (1904), and is best remembered for Winterkoninkje (1906). He became officer in the Orde van Oranje-Nassau.

Dekking died in Rotterdam on 8 October 1939, aged 67.

References

Bibliography

External links
 Henri Dekking at the Digital Library for Dutch Literature (in Dutch)

20th-century Dutch journalists
Dutch dramatists and playwrights
1871 births
1939 deaths
Writers from Rotterdam
Officers of the Order of Orange-Nassau